Brickeens is a very small townland in County Longford, Ireland. It is about five kilometres north of Keenagh and eight kilometres south of Longford town. Evidence of ancient settlement in the townland include two ringforts.

References

Townlands of County Longford